is a city located in Akita Prefecture, Japan. , the city had an estimated population of 89,574  in 34,240 households, and a population density of 130 persons per km².

Geography
Yokote is located in southeast corner of Akita Prefecture by the Ōu Mountains and Iwate Prefecture to the east. The Yokote River flows from the eastern Ōu Mountains through the city.

Neighboring municipalities
Akita Prefecture
Yurihonjō
Daisen
Yuzawa
Misato
Ugo
Higashinaruse
Iwate Prefecture
Nishiwaga

Climate
Yokote has a Humid continental climate (Köppen climate classification Dfa/Cfa) with large seasonal temperature differences, with warm to hot (and often humid) summers and cold (sometimes severely cold) winters. Precipitation is significant throughout the year, but is heaviest from August to October.

Demographics
Per Japanese census data, the population of Yokote has been in decline for the past 70 years.

History
The area of present-day Yokote was part of ancient Dewa Province and was the homeland of the Kiyohara clan of the Heian period Gosannen War. At the end of the Sengoku period, the area came under the control of the Onodera clan, who ruled from Yokote Castle. However, the Onodera sided against Tokugawa Ieyasu at the Battle of Sekigahara and the area came under the control of the Satake clan, who had been relocated to Kubota Domain from their former holdings in Hitachi Province. Kubota Domain was uncommon in that it contained more than one castle, despite the Tokugawa shogunate's "one castle per domain" rule, and Yokote remained a secondary castle town under the Kubota clan until the Meiji restoration.

After the start of the Meiji period, the area became part of Hiraka District, Akita Prefecture in 1878, with one town and 23 villages. The modern city of Yokote was founded on April 1, 1951.

On October 1, 2005, the towns of Hiraka, Jūmonji, Masuda, Omonogawa and Ōmori, and the villages of Sannai, and Taiyū (all from Hiraka District) were merged into Yokote, which now occupies all of former Hiraka District, plus the villages of Meiji and Nishinarusei (formerly from Ogachi District), and the village of Kanazawa (formerly from Senboku District).

Government

Yokote has a mayor-council form of government with a directly elected mayor and a unicameral city legislature of 25 members. The city contributes four members to the Akita Prefectural Assembly.  In terms of national politics, the city is part of Akita District 3 of the lower house of the Diet of Japan.

Economy
The economy of Yokote is based on agriculture.

Education
Yokote has fourteen public elementary schools and six public middle schools operated by the city government and five public high schools operated by the Akita Prefectural Board of Education. The prefecture also operates one combined middle/high school and one special education school for the handicapped.

Transportation

Railway
 East Japan Railway Company -  Ōu Main Line
  -   -  -  
 East Japan Railway Company -  Kitakami Line
  -  -    -

Highway

Local attractions 

Akita Museum of Modern Art

Local events

Kamakura Festival 
Yokote is known for its  Kamakura Festival, a midwinter festival in which igloo-like snow houses are made throughout the town.  It is held in the days leading to the Bonden Festival (mid February) and its location is focused around the city hall area.  Children and others sit in the kamakura and serve amazake and mochi to visitors.  In addition, several stalls are situated around town serving other types of typical Japanese festival food, including the town's own meibutsu "Yokote yakisoba".

An altar for the water deity is carved into the rear of the room inside each kamakura, where people pray for abundant harvests, the safety of their family members, protection against fire and for academic success. In addition to the large igloos, there are mini-kamakura which are spread throughout the city. There are candles Inside the tiny snow domes. Some of the regular kamakura and the mini-kamakura are sponsored by local businesses and can sometimes look like an advertisement for a product (like a cell phone). The kamakura can be experienced year round in a building adjacent to Yokote City Hall called the Kamakura-kan.

International relations

Twin towns/Sister cities
Yokote is twinned with:
  Atsugi, Kanagawa, Japan, since May 24, 1985
  Naka, Ibaraki, Japan, since October 22, 2004

Noted people from Yokote 
Keishi Handa, basketball player 
Makoto Hasegawa, basketball head coach
Tatsuzō Ishikawa, author
Kiyonomori Masao, sumo wrestler
Yasushi Sasaki, movie director.
Sayuri Sugawara, musician
Yu Takahashi, musician
Manabu Terata, politician
Yoshinori Tomura, general
Daisuke Usami, volleyball player

References

External links

Official Website 
Information & Articles in English
Yokote Tourism Website 

 
Cities in Akita Prefecture